Thicker Than Water (Tjockare än vatten) is a television drama produced by Sweden's SVT in cooperation with Finland's Svenska Yle. Most of the action is set in Åland. The show's first season, consisting of ten episodes, was shown in Sweden in 2014, the second in 2016.

Plot
Three siblings are reunited at their mother's guesthouse in Åland at the start of the summer. When Anna-Lisa Waldemar takes her own life, the siblings—eldest brother Lasse, a struggling Stockholm restaurateur, younger sister Jonna, an actor, and middle child Oskar, who manages the guesthouse alongside his wife Liv—discover that her will requires them to spend the season running the business before they can inherit it from her. Secrets from twenty years earlier and from more recent times are uncovered, as well as more than one body, as the siblings attempt to overcome their differences for the sake of their mother—and the money.

Cast and characters
 Björn Bengtsson as Lasse Waldemar
 Joel Spira as Oskar Waldemar
 Aliette Opheim as Jonna Waldemar
 Stina Ekblad as Anna-Lisa Waldemar
 Fredrik Hammar as Mauritz Waldemar
 Jessica Grabowsky as Liv Waldemar
 Saga Sarkola as Cecilia Waldemar
 Molly Nutley as Kim Waldemar
 Donald Högberg as Konrad Waldemar
 Torkel Petersson as Manne Wahlstrom
 Johanna Ringbom as Mildred Pahkinen
 Tobias Zilliacus as Mikael Rosén
 Charlie Petersson as Vincent Högberg
 Tanja Lorentzon as Priest Petra
 Henrik Norlén as Bjarne
 Thomas Hedengran as Tommy Fasth
 Göran Forsmark as the director
 Tova Magnusson as Rachel Ohlson
 Stefan Sauk as Bear Lehman
 Alfons Röblom as Henrik Ölmqvist
 Samuli Vauramo as Wille Ek

References

External links
 

2014 Swedish television series debuts
Swedish drama television series
Television shows set in Sweden
Swedish-language television shows